Smile (shortened from its former name of Smile of a Child) is an American Christian free-to-air television network owned and operated by the Trinity Broadcasting Network. The network is aimed at children aged 2-12 and offers a mixture of children's religious and family-oriented programming. The network was founded as the television branch of TBN's Smile of a Child ministry, created by TBN co-founder Jan Crouch.

Smile is also available on pay-TV providers as well as on some streaming services that offer TBN's six U.S. networks.

The network is available in the U.S. on AT&T U-Verse and Wave Broadband and throughout North and Central America as a free-to-air channel on Galaxy 14 C-band, Galaxy 19 Ku band and available with Glorystar Christian Satellite. Internationally, ABS1 satellite to Asia, India and the Middle East, and Agila 2 both C-band and Ku band signal in some areas of Asia and the Philippines. The network is also livestreamed on both its own and TBN's website.

In addition, parent network TBN runs a "Smile" block on Saturday mornings. Competing network KTV aired a 12 hour block of Smile programming from October 26, 2015, through June 30, 2017.

History

Early history, as Smile of a Child

Founded as Smile of a Child TV by TBN co-founder Jan Crouch, the network was developed and named after Smile of a Child, a children's outreach ministry founded by Jan and Paul Crouch in the 1990s to provide services and donations to needy children worldwide. The network launched on December 24, 2005 at 3:00 a.m. Eastern Time, with the holiday-themed special Martin the Cobbler as its inaugural program.

Smile was initially available as a 24-hour-a-day service on all platforms, debuted on digital subchannels of TBN owned-and-operated station in 13 markets. Over the subsequent years, Smile expanded its national coverage to all of TBN's owned-and-operated and affiliated stations in nearly 40 markets, carried usually on the fifth subchannel (for example, if the local TBN station broadcasts on channel 17, then Smile would be carried on digital subchannel 17.5). The network's original butterfly logo is a visual representation of the initials of Jan Crouch's maiden name, JWB (Janice Wendell Bethany).

Multicasting consolidation with JUCE TV
On June 1, 2015, Smile was combined into a single subchannel with sister network JUCE TV (which targets teenagers and young adults 13 to 30 years of age), under a timeshare arrangement. As a result of the realignment, for over-the-air viewers, Smile was originally reduced to a 9-hour daily programming schedule (from 6 a.m. to 3 p.m. Eastern Time) on the third subchannel occupied by JUCE (which continues to air over its existing subchannel slot for the remainder of the broadcast day) on the 38 stations owned directly by TBN and through its subsidiary Community Educational Television. The following week, the time share was modified so that Smile would air from 7 a.m. to 7 p.m. (Eastern), with JUCE airing the remainder of the day, giving each network a daily 12-hour window on its O&O stations' DT3 subchannels.

The change – due to technical limitations with its stations' existing digital compression equipment – is a byproduct of the launch of TBN Salsa, a digital subchannel network targeting English-speaking Latino viewers which launched on that date.

Though it had a reduced presence on broadcast television, Smile continued to maintain a 24-hour-day schedule via live stream on TBN's website, and mobile and digital media players as well as on select cable and satellite providers that carry the TBN multicast networks, as was the case before the over-the-air consolidation of the two networks.

On January 1, 2017, the network underwent a major rebranding, shortening its name to simply Smile; accordingly, it dropped the butterfly logo and graphics package that had been in use since 2005.

Resumption of 24-hour service
On January 1, 2020, TBN resumed offering a 24-hour feed of Smile on its multicast tier over the DT3 subchannel of its owned-and-operated stations. (Concurrently, JUCE TV was moved to the DT5 feed previously occupied by TBN Salsa, which the ministry pulled from its broadcast stations in May 2019, when a standard definition feed of the main TBN signal began being offered as a placeholder feed.)

In late February 2021, Olympusat, the main provider of TBN's networks to cable providers in the United States (including Verizon FiOS and Xfinity), discontinued carriage of the network, thus affecting carriage of Smile to those systems.

Programming

See also
TCT Kids TV
JUCE TV
Positiv

Awards and honors
2008: Parents Television Council Entertainment Seal of Approval

References

External links
Smile
SOAC & JUCE TV Channels Merged in TBN Australia

Preschool education television networks
Christian mass media companies
Evangelical television networks
Television programming blocks in the United States
Religious television stations in the United States
English-language television stations in the United States
Television channels and stations established in 2005
Trinity Broadcasting Network
Children's television networks in the United States